Bharathan (1947–1998) was an Indian filmmaker, artist, and art director.

Bharathan may also refer to:

 Bharathan (Tamil director), Indian filmmaker and writer
 Bharathan (1992 film), a Tamil film starring Vijayakanth and Bhanupriya
 Bharathan Effect, a 2007 Malayalam film starring Biju Menon and Geethu Mohandas